Vinod Kumar Singh alias Pandit Singh (7 January 1962 – 7 May 2021) was an Indian politician from the state of Uttar Pradesh. A three-time legislator and a senior member of the Samajwadi Party, Pandit Singh represented Gonda assembly constituency in the 13th, 14th and 16th Uttar Pradesh Legislative Assembly which is the lower house of the bicameral legislature of Uttar Pradesh. He also served as a cabinet minister in the Govt. of Uttar Pradesh under the chief ministership of Akhilesh Yadav. He also contested the 2019 parliamentary elections from Gonda but lost to Kirti Vardhan Singh of BJP. He died on 7 May 2021 from COVID-19 related complications at the age of 59 years.

A number of politicians including Hriday Narayan Dikshit- the then Speaker of Uttar Pradesh Legislative Assembly and Akhilesh Yadav- national president of the Samajwadi Party have expressed grief at his demise.

Political career 
His political career was started in 1995. In the year of 1996 first time he was elected as an MLA of Gonda assembly constituency. In 2003 he was made the minister of state of Medical & Education in the cabinet of Mulayam Singh Yadav. In the year of 2012 he was again elected as MLA of Gonda seat and served as Minister of Revenue in the cabinet of Akhilesh Yadav. In October 2013 he resigned from minister post and later he became Minister of Secondary Education of UP. In 2014 he contested from Kaiserganj Lok Sabha constituency and get defeated by Brij Bhushan Sharan Singh and later he served as Minister of Agriculture.

References

1960s births
2021 deaths
Uttar Pradesh MLAs 1997–2002
Uttar Pradesh MLAs 2002–2007
Uttar Pradesh MLAs 2007–2012
Uttar Pradesh MLAs 2012–2017
Samajwadi Party politicians from Uttar Pradesh
Deaths from the COVID-19 pandemic in India
People from Gonda district

5. https://www.livehindustan.com/uttar-pradesh/story-after-the-death-of-former-minister-pandit-singh-son-suraj-s-health-deteriorated-advice-to-be-taken-to-lucknow-4018439.html (Live Hindustan) Retrieved 7 Oct 2022